Eleftherios Veryvakis (21 January 1935 – 6 August 2012) was a Greek politician and ex-member of the Greek Parliament for the Panhellenic Socialist Movement (PASOK).

In June 1967, during the military junta he was arrested and tortured for three months.

He was member of PASOK since its establishment in 1974 and he was elected to the Greek parliament for the first time in 1977. He got reelected in all elections till 2000. In 2003 he replaced Evangelos Giannopoulos after the latter's death.

He died on 6 August 2012.

References

1935 births
2012 deaths
PASOK politicians
Greek MPs 1977–1981
Greek MPs 1981–1985
Greek MPs 1985–1989
Greek MPs 1989 (June–November)
Greek MPs 1989–1990
Greek MPs 1990–1993
Greek MPs 1993–1996
Greek MPs 1996–2000
Greek MPs 2000–2004
Justice ministers of Greece
Greek torture victims
Politicians from Chania